State council elections were held in Malaya from 10 to 29 October 1954 in Trengganu and Johore.

Results

Johore

Trengganu

References

State elections in Malaysia
State